Raja Swar Khan (died 1980), of Chajana Murree,  was a notable Mangral and a headmaster of a Pakistani school as well as  the leading personality of his area. He remained a teacher during the British rule over India and also served after independence, but retired in 1968. Khan was an active worker in the independence movement of Pakistan, who met with Quai-i-Azam and Sikh leader Master Tara Singh.
After retirement he remained very active in solving different local disputes in the area. Many high-profile people of modern times got their education from this great man.

References

Pakistani educators
1980 deaths
Year of birth missing